is a Super Robot mecha anime series produced by Toei Animation. It was a re-imagining of the original series created by Go Nagai (who also created Mazinger Z) and was aired in TV Asahi from November 12, 2005 to September 24, 2006, lasting a total of 39 episodes.

Plot
Five years ago, Daiya Tsuwabuki was on a fishing trip with his father when giant monsters attacked. Daiya was saved by the crew of Daiku Maryu. In the present, Daiya believes that his father is still alive, but no one believes him, not even his own mother. However, when the same monsters attack the city, Daiya becomes the pilot of Gaiking and joins Daiku Maryu as they go to the world of Darius to stop them from taking over the Earth.

Series differences
This version features a completely different story and main character. However, some of the names are very similar to the original series. Both Daikū Maryū and Gaiking have similar designs to the originals: Gaiking's torso is still skull shaped, the support machines come from Daikū Maryū. Gaiking also uses its Face Open attack in manner different from the original. Two of Daiku Maryu's weapons from the original series, Miracle Drill and Giant Cutter, are attached to Daichi Maryu and Tenkuu Maryu in this series. There are also differences in terms of location setting and Daiku-Maryu's ability to jump across both Earth and the Underground World from the use of the Dimensional Jump. Additionally, while Daiya has the same last name as Sanshiro (Tsuwabaki), the two characters are not related.

Cast
Daiya Tsuwabuki  Mayumi Tanaka
Sakon  Hideyuki Tanaka
Naoto Hayami  Naomi Shindoh
Puria  Reiko Kiuchi
Daimon-jiisan  Ryûzaburô Ôtomo
Shizuka Fujiyama  Satsuki Yukino
Doctor Wan  Shinji Nakae
Jian Xin  Takeshi Kusao
Vice-captain Rosa  Tomoe Hanba
Lulu  Tomoko Kawakami
Captain Garis  Toru Ohkawa

Songs
 "GAIKING" by Psychic Lover (OP, EP 39 Ending)
 "Boku ni dekiru koto" by Hideaki Tokunaga (ED1)
 "oh! my god" by Psychic Lover (ED2)

Appearance in games
Gaiking: Legend of Daikū Maryū is included in the 2009 Super Robot Wars game, Super Robot Wars K for the Nintendo DS. It was hinted that the series' Dimensional Jump between Earth and the other world is the main focus of this game. The show also featured in Super Robot Gakuen. In 2010, Gaiking was again featured in a Nintendo DS SRW game, Super Robot Wars L.

See also
 Gaiking

References

External links
   Toei Animation's Official Gaiking Homepage
 
 

2006 Japanese television series endings
Go Nagai
Super robot anime and manga
Toei Animation television
TV Asahi original programming